Almalı (also, Almalo and Almaly) is a village and municipality in the Qakh Rayon of Azerbaijan.  It has a population of 1,883.

References 

Populated places in Qakh District